John Glenn Gerlach (May 11, 1917 – August 28, 1999) was a shortstop in Major League Baseball. He played for the Chicago White Sox.

References

External links

1917 births
1999 deaths
Major League Baseball shortstops
Chicago White Sox players
Baseball players from Wisconsin
People from Shullsburg, Wisconsin
Wisconsin Badgers baseball players